Dano is a department or commune of Ioba Province in south-eastern Burkina Faso. Its capital is the town of Dano.

Towns and villages
Dano

References

Departments of Burkina Faso
Ioba Province

fr:Dano